Presidential elections were held in the Nagorno-Karabakh Republic on 24 November 1996. The result was a victory for independent candidate Robert Kocharyan, who received 89% of the vote.

Results

References

Nagorno
Nagorno
1996 in the Nagorno-Karabakh Republic
Presidential elections in the Republic of Artsakh